Hygrocybe bolensis is a mushroom of the waxcap genus Hygrocybe. Generally found growing in soil in moist, shady conditions. It was 474402described in 2000 by the mycologist Anthony M. Young.

References

Fungi described in 2000
Fungi of Australia
bolensis